Delve may refer to:

People
 Frederick Delve (1902–1995), English firefighter
 Gareth Delve (born 1982), Welsh rugby union player
 John Delve (born 1953), English football player
 Suzanne Delvé (1892–1986), French film actress

Places
 Delve, Schleswig-Holstein, Germany

Other
 Delve Special, BBC programme
 Microsoft Delve